Alnus mandshurica is a species of Alnus from China.

References

External links
 
 

mandshurica
Plants described in 1932